is a castle located in Matsumae in Hokkaidō, Japan, and is the northernmost castle in Japan. The only traditional style Edo period castle in Hokkaidō, it was the chief residence of the han (estate) of the Matsumae clan.

History
First built in 1606 by Matsumae Yoshihiro under orders from the Tokugawa shogunate, which required his clan to defend the area, and by extension the whole of Japan, from the Ainu "barbarians" to the north.  It burned down in 1637 but was rebuilt in 1639. It once controlled all passage through Hokkaidō to the rest of Japan.

The present castle complex, which dates from 1854, was constructed to deter attacks by foreign naval forces. Only the 30-metre-high tenshu (main tower) and a gatehouse survived destruction following the Meiji Restoration, which began in 1868. However, the tenshu burned down in 1949 and a concrete replica was built in 1960.

Today, all of the castle site is now a public park.

Festivals 
Approximately 8,000 cherry trees are planted in Matsumae Park, which is approximately 150,000 m2 around the site of Matsumae Castle. More than 200,000 people visit the Matsumae Sakura Festival every spring to see cherry blossoms.

Since 1984, the "Matsumae Castle Age Festival" has been held in August.

See also
Goryōkaku  – a star fort constructed in the Bakumatsu era

References

Further reading

External links 
Official website(Japanese)

Castles in Hokkaido
Matsumae clan
Matsumae, Hokkaido